Events from 2022 in the Northern Mariana Islands.

Incumbents 

 Governor: Ralph Torres 
 Lieutenant Governor: Arnold Palacios

Events 
Ongoing – COVID-19 pandemic in the Northern Mariana Islands

 8 November – The 2022 Northern Mariana Islands gubernatorial election took place
 25 November – The runoff election is won by Arnold Palacios, who took over as Governor in January 2023.

Sports
 17 to 25 June – The 2022 Pacific Mini Games were held Saipan.

Deaths

References 

2022 in the Northern Mariana Islands
2020s in the Northern Mariana Islands
Years of the 21st century in the Northern Mariana Islands
Northern Mariana Islands